The 1520s BC was a decade lasting from January 1, 1529 BC to December 31, 1520 BC.

Events
 1528 Birth of Dan
 1525 BC—End of Fifteenth dynasty of Egypt.
 1522 BC—Jacob migrates to Egypt, settling in the Land of Goshen, according to the Hebrew calendar.
 1521 BC—April 24—Lunar Saros 36 begins.

Significant people

References